The Markham River is a river in eastern Papua New Guinea.

The river was named in 1873 by Captain John Moresby, R.N., in honour of Sir Clements Markham, then Secretary of the Royal Geographical Society. A single-lane steel bridge, 1690 feet long – by far the longest bridge built in Papua until that time – was opened in January 1955.

References

Rivers of Papua New Guinea
Morobe Province
Lae